Solosez is an electronic mailing list of more than 3,300 members.  Most of the members are lawyers, law students and law-related professionals, although the list welcomes all comers, lawyer and non-lawyer alike.  Sponsored and hosted by the American Bar Association (ABA) and its General Practice Solo and Small Firm Division. The list started in 1996 with just a handful of members.  It quickly grew to be the most successful and active listserve sponsored by the ABA.  The ABA also maintains a website, Solosez.com, which features among other things a searchable archive of past discussion threads.

Overview
Solosez members are located throughout the United States and in other countries, including members located in Germany, Hong Kong, Israel, Japan, Korea, India, China, South Africa, Panama, New Zealand, Mexico, Denmark, France, and Pakistan.  

The list is designed as a forum for lawyers who are solo and small firm practitioners and is intended to help them share and obtain information on a wide array of personal and professional issues.  List members refer to themselves as "Sezzers." Lawyers can seek advice and suggestions from fellow lawyers on topics including how to start a law office, litigation strategies, dealing with difficult clients, the newest legal software, recommendations on computers and other law office technology, and any other topic that solo and small firm lawyers face. The list also serves as a virtual "water cooler", where members located around the world can discuss those topics common to face-to-face discussions around the water cooler or in the lunchroom.

Each October, Solosez members from around the country and around the world attend a group admission to the bar of the United States Supreme Court. 

There are few rules. One rule requires that, before posting the first substantive message to the group, new members must first send a message which introduces themselves by disclosing their favorite drink and the names of any pets living in their home or office. Other rules prohibit political discussion and personal attacks. Until August 31, 2021, the current administrator was jennifer j. rose, who also compiled the most popular discussion threads or topics on a monthly basis going back to January 2005. She managed this list since 1997 with a hiatus between September 2007 and January 2009. The popular threads link is available to non-subscribers, allowing them to get a sneak preview of recent "hot" discussion items. Reading the popular threads, or searching through the complete archives, often entices "lurkers"—as those who choose to just read the email discussions and not participate are called—to go one step further and begin to post, offering their own tidbits of wisdom or asking about their pressing issue du jour. 

The current list owners and managers are ABA staff members Kimberly Kocian and Steve Wildi.

Throughout the U.S., Solosez subscribers have organized, on their own and without any support or endorsement from the ABA, periodic lunch and dinner meetings in various cities. Boston, for instance, has four separate Solosez dinner groups. 

Several listserves unaffiliated with the ABA have been spun off by list members, including Solomarketing (focusing on the marketing of sole practices and small firms), Solopol (focusing on political discussions which are otherwise prohibited from Solosez), Soloright (focusing on political discussions from a conservative viewpoint), and Soloprog (focusing on political discussions from a progressive viewpoint).

Membership in Solosez is free. Membership in the American Bar Association is not a prerequisite.

Notes

References

Further reading

About Solosez at the ABA
"Go Solo, but Stay Wired to Virtual Partners", article at HotResponse.com
"Managing Solosez", article at My Shingle
"Solo Resources from Solosez", article at Jim Calloway's blog Law Practice Tips
"Solosez Supreme Court Group Admission", article at the ABA
"Online Communities", administrator's article at the ABA

External links
Solosez.com – official website
General Practice, Solo and Small Firm Division of the ABA

Electronic mailing lists